Gorgyra minima, the minimal leaf sitter, is a butterfly in the family Hesperiidae. It is found in Guinea, Sierra Leone, Liberia, Ivory Coast, Ghana, western Nigeria, Cameroon, Gabon, the Republic of the Congo, the Democratic Republic of the Congo, Uganda (from the west to the West Nile Province) and western Kenya. The habitat consists of forests, including well-developed secondary growth, and Guinea savanna.

References

Butterflies described in 1896
Erionotini
Butterflies of Africa